Fountain Park is an unincorporated community in Champaign County, in the U.S. state of Ohio.

History
Fountain Park was platted in 1883. A post office called Fountain Park was established in 1886, and remained in operation until 1904.

References

Unincorporated communities in Champaign County, Ohio
Unincorporated communities in Ohio